Typhoon Tip, known in the Philippines as Typhoon Warling, was the largest and most intense tropical cyclone ever recorded. The forty-third tropical depression, nineteenth tropical storm, twelfth typhoon, and third super typhoon of the 1979 Pacific typhoon season, Tip developed out of a disturbance within the monsoon trough on October 4 near Pohnpei in Micronesia. Initially, Tropical Storm Roger to the northwest hindered the development and motion of Tip, though after the storm tracked farther north, Tip was able to intensify. Tip slowly weakened as it continued west-northwestward and later turned to the northeast, in response to an approaching trough. The typhoon made landfall in southern Japan on October 19, and became an extratropical cyclone shortly thereafter. Tip's extratropical remnants continued moving east-northeastward, until they dissipated near the Aleutian Islands on October 24.
 
U.S. Air Force aircraft flew 60 weather reconnaissance missions into the typhoon, making Tip one of the most closely observed tropical cyclones. Rainfall from Tip indirectly led to a fire that killed 13 Marines and injured 68 at Combined Arms Training Center, Camp Fuji in the Shizuoka Prefecture of Japan. Elsewhere in the country, the typhoon caused widespread flooding and 42 deaths; offshore shipwrecks left 44 people killed or missing.

Meteorological history 

At the end of September 1979, three circulations developed within the monsoon trough that extended from the Philippines to the Marshall Islands. The westernmost disturbance developed into a tropical depression on October 1, to the west of Luzon, which would later become Typhoon Sarah on October 7. On October 3, the disturbance southwest of Guam developed into Tropical Storm Roger, and later on the same day, a third tropical disturbance that would later become Typhoon Tip formed south of Pohnpei. Strong flow from across the equator was drawn into Roger's wind circulation, initially preventing significant development of the precursor disturbance to Tip. Despite the unfavorable air pattern, the tropical disturbance gradually organized as it moved westward. Due to the large-scale circulation pattern of Tropical Storm Roger, Tip's precursor moved erratically and slowly executed a cyclonic loop to the southeast of Chuuk. A reconnaissance aircraft flight into the system late on October 4 confirmed the existence of a closed low-level circulation, and early on October 5, the Joint Typhoon Warning Center (JTWC) issued its first warning on Tropical Depression Twenty-Three-W.

While executing another loop near Chuuk, the tropical depression intensified into Tropical Storm Tip, though the storm failed to organize significantly due to the influence of Tropical Storm Roger. After drifting erratically for several days, Tip began a steady northwest motion on October 8. By that time, Tropical Storm Roger had become an extratropical cyclone, resulting in the southerly flow to be entrained into Tip. An area of a tropical upper tropospheric trough moved north of Guam at the time, providing an excellent outflow channel north of Tip. Later that day, Tip intensified to attain typhoon status.

Owing to very favorable conditions for development, Typhoon Tip rapidly intensified over the open waters of the western Pacific Ocean. Late on October 10, Tip attained wind speeds equal to Category 4 strength on the Saffir–Simpson Hurricane Scale (SSHS), and it became a super typhoon on the next day. Tip crossed the 135th meridian east on the afternoon of October 13, prompting the PAGASA to issue warnings on Typhoon Tip, assigning it the local name Warling.

On October 17, Tip began to weaken steadily and decrease in size, recurving northeastward under the influence of a mid-level trough the next day. It continued rapidly northeastward through the country and became an extratropical cyclone over northern Honshū a few hours after moving ashore. The extratropical remnant of Tip proceeded east-northeastward and gradually weakened, crossing the International Date Line on October 22. The storm was last observed near the Aleutian Islands of Alaska on October 24.

Impact 

The typhoon produced heavy rainfall early in its lifetime while passing near Guam, including a total of 23.1 cm (9.09 in) at Andersen Air Force Base. The outer rainbands of the large circulation of Tip produced moderate rainfall in the mountainous regions of the Philippine islands of Luzon and Visayas.

Heavy rainfall from the typhoon breached a flood-retaining wall at Camp Fuji, a training facility for the United States Marine Corps near Yokosuka. Marines inside the camp weathered the storm inside huts situated at the base of a hill which housed a fuel farm. The breach led to hoses being dislodged from two rubber storage bladders, releasing large quantities of fuel. The fuel flowed down the hill and was ignited by a heater used to warm one of the huts. The resultant fire killed 13 Marines, injured 68, and caused moderate damage to the facility. The facility's barracks were destroyed, along with fifteen huts and several other structures. The barracks were rebuilt, and a memorial was established for those who lost their lives in the fire.

During recurvature, Typhoon Tip passed about 65 km (40 mi) east of Okinawa. Sustained winds reached 72 km/h (44 mph), with gusts to 112 km/h (69 mph). Sustained wind velocities in Japan are not known, though they were estimated at minimal typhoon strength. The passage of the typhoon through the region resulted in millions of dollars in damage to the agricultural and fishing industries of the country. Eight ships were grounded or sunk by Tip, leaving 44 fishermen dead or unaccounted for. A Chinese freighter broke in half as a result of the typhoon, though its crew of 46 were rescued. The rainfall led to over 600 mudslides throughout the mountainous regions of Japan and flooded more than 22,000 homes; 42 people died throughout the country, with another 71 missing and 283 injured. River embankments broke in 70 places, destroying 27 bridges, while about 105 dikes were destroyed. Following the storm, at least 11,000 people were left homeless. Tip destroyed apple, rice, peach and other crops. Five ships sank in heavy seas off the coast and 50-story buildings swayed in the capital, Tokyo. Transportation in the country was disrupted; 200 trains and 160 domestic flights were canceled. Tip was described as the most severe storm to strike Japan in 13 years.

Records and meteorological statistics 

At its largest, Tip was nearly half the size of the contiguous United States.

The records set by Tip still technically stand, though with the end of routine reconnaissance aircraft flights in the western Pacific Ocean in August 1987, modern researchers have questioned whether Tip indeed remains the strongest. After a detailed study, three researchers determined that two typhoons, Angela in 1995 and Gay in 1992, registered higher Dvorak numbers than Tip, and concluded that one or both of the two may have therefore been more intense. Due to the dearth of direct observations and Hurricane hunters into these cyclones, conclusive data is lacking. However, the NHC noted in their report on the cyclone that Patricia may have surpassed Tip at the time of its peak intensity, as it was undergoing rapid intensification; however, due to the lack of direct aircraft observations at the time of the storm's peak, this possibility cannot be determined.

Despite the typhoon's intensity and damage, the name Tip was not retired and was reused in 1983, 1986, and 1989. However, the JTWC changed their naming list halfway through the 1989 Pacific typhoon season, and the name Tip was discontinued from use afterward.

See also 

 List of tropical cyclone records
 Other notable tropical cyclones that broke records:
 Cyclone Mahina (1899) – Possibly the most intense storm recorded in the Southern Hemisphere, with a peak low pressure of 
 Typhoon Nancy (1961) - An extremely powerful typhoon that unofficially had the strongest winds ever recorded in a typhoon, with maximum 1-minute sustained winds at 215 mph (345 km/h), tying Hurricane Patricia
 Tropical Storm Marco (2008) – The smallest tropical cyclone on record
 Hurricane Patricia (2015) – Second-most intense tropical cyclone, most intense ever recorded in the Western Hemisphere, with the highest maximum 1-minute sustained winds recorded in a tropical cyclone, at 215 mph (345 km/h)
Also became the most intense landfalling tropical cyclone on record, impacting with same pressure
 Typhoon Goni (2020) – A Category 5-equivalent super typhoon that became the strongest landfalling storm on record, with 1-minute sustained winds of 
 Other notable tropical cyclones that impacted Japan:
 Typhoon Vera (1959) - The strongest storm to ever impact Japan, with maximum sustained wind speeds of 160 mph (260 km/h) upon landfall - Comparable to a Category 5-equivalent super typhoon
 Typhoon Wipha (2013) - Similar impacts and dissipation
 Typhoon Lan (2017) – Another very large and powerful typhoon
 Typhoon Jebi (2018) – A typhoon that took a slightly similar track path and struck Japan as a Category 2-equivalent typhoon; caused substantial damage, primarily in the Kansai region
 Typhoon Trami (2018) – A Category 5-equivalent super typhoon that affected the same general area
 Typhoon Hagibis (2019) – A typhoon that took almost similar track path, similar size, similar landfall date and struck Japan as a Category 2-equivalent typhoon; caused tremendous damage and marked the 40th anniversary of Tip
 Hypercane

Notes

References

External links 
 

Typhoon Tip
Typhoon Tip
1979 Pacific typhoon season
Typhoons
Typhoons in Guam
Typhoons in Japan
October 1979 events in Asia